Mathilde Alanic (pen name, Miranda; 10 November 1864 – 20 October 1948) was a French writer of sentimental novels and short stories. Her work appeared in Les Annales politiques et littéraires, L'Eventail, Le Magasin pittoresque, Musée des familles, Le National illustré, La Petite Illustration, Le Petit Journal, Le Petit Parisien, Revue de l'Anjou, and other journals. Alanic was a recipient of the Montyon prize, Jules-Favre prize, Sobrier-Arnould prize, and was promoted Chevalier, Legion of Honour. She died in 1948.

Early life and education
Mathilde Alanic was born 10 November 1864, in Angers (Maine-et-Loire). Her father, Julien Louis Alanic, was an entrepreneur and a Breton house painter from the faubourg Bressigny, in Angers. Her mother was Mathilde Louise (Verdun) Alanic.

Alanic attended a Catholic boarding school before becoming a pupil of Henri Bergson at the Ecole Supérieure des Lettres in Angers. She wrote a romantic Spanish "novel" for her family's entertainment at the age of nine, versified correspondence to her friends at the age of 11, then short stories under the pseudonym of "Miranda", in the Revue de l'Anjou, L'Eventail, and Parisian reviews, which got her noticed.

Career
The Christmas tale, "La soutane de l'abbé Constantin", came out in 1897, and was followed by "Norbert Dys". Her first novel, Le Maître du Moulin Blanc, appeared in La Petite Illustration in 1898. She then wrote about thirty mainly sentimental novels, but also wrote many short stories like "Marianik" in 1899.

She published Maître du Moulin Blanc in 1901. In the same year, she began her Nicole series, Ma cousine Nicole, which ran through 1939. It followed the life of a young girl, through her marriage (1920), motherhood (1921) and being a grandmother (1929). she became a member of the Société des gens de lettres de France (SGDLF) in 1904. Between 1906 and 1923, she collaborated on three novels with Henri Gautier.

In addition to Bergson, she received encouragement and inspiration from André Bellessort, René Boylesve, Adolphe Brisson, Alberic Cahuet, François Coppée, Camille Flammarion, Ernest Flammarion, Georges Lecomte, and Albert Sorel. Her works were appreciated outside France, especially in Belgium and Switzerland. Her works were presented as "classic reading" in schools in England and Germany.

Awards and honours
In 1903, she received the Montyon prize from the Académie Française for her work Ma Cousine Nicole as well as in 1929 for Le mariage de Hoche. In 1913, she received the Jules-Favre prize from the French Academy for her work Petite miette. In 1920, she received the Sobrier-Arnould prize also awarded by the Académie Française for Les roses refleurissent. On 3 February 1929, she was promoted Chevalier, Legion of Honour on the recommendation of the Minister of Public Instruction and Fine Arts, for her 35-year literary career.

Death and legacy
Mathilde Alanic died 20 October 1948 (aged 84) in the city of her birth.

Streets in Angers and in Saint-Sylvain-d'Anjou are named in her honor.

Selected works 

Norbert Dys, 1899
Le Maître du Moulin-Blanc, 1902
Ma cousine Nicole, 1902
Mie Jacqueline, 1903
Les Espérances, 1906
Le devoir d'un fils, 1906
La Gloire de Fonteclaire, 1907
La romance de Joconde, 1908
Aime et tu renaîtras, 1908
La fille de la sirène, 1909
Les Espérances, Collection Stella, no. 4
L'oiseau couleur du temps
Francine chez les gens de rien
Monette, Collection Stella, no. 56
La Petite Miette, 1911
La Petite Guignolette
Et L'amour dispose, 1911
Le soleil couchant, 1913
Les roses refleurissent, Plon 1919
Nicole mariée, 1920
Nicole Maman, 1921
Aimes et tu renaitras, 1921
Le Sachet de lavande, 1924
L'aube du cœur, 1925
Le Mariage de Hoche, 1928 
Les Loups Sur La Lande, 1928
Anne et le Bonheur, 1930
Étoiles dans la nuit, 1932
Les Danaïdes, 1934
Les remous du passés,1935
Féli, 1936
Nicole et les temps nouveaux, 1939
Le fuseau d'or, 1941
La Cinquième Jeunesse de Mme Ermance, 1944

References

External links
 
 Marianik at Wikisource (in French)

1864 births
1948 deaths
20th-century French novelists
20th-century French short story writers
20th-century French women writers
French women novelists
French women short story writers
People from Angers
Chevaliers of the Légion d'honneur